Tom Shively (born November 11, 1946) is a Democratic member of the Missouri House of Representatives. He represents the 8th District, encompassing  all or portions of Linn, Macon, Shelby and Sullivan counties. Due to Missouri House redistricting Shively ran for the newly created Missouri House 5th district in November, 2012. He lost to Republican Lindell Shumake, who until redistricting had represented the Missouri House 6th district. Shively will continue to represent the 8th district until January, 2013.

Personal history
Thomas Shively was born in Hannibal, Missouri and raised in Shelby county. After graduating from North Shelby High School in 1964 he attended the University of Missouri in Columbia, earning a Bachelor of Science degree in Agriculture in 1968. Representative Shively served in United States Air Force, and taught vocational agriculture at northeast Missouri schools for over three decades. When not involved with legislative duties Shively works with one of his sons in a cattle and row crop farming operation. Tom Shively and his wife Rose are the parents of three children.

Political history
Tom Shively first ran for the Missouri House of Representatives in 2002, losing to Chris Shoemaker.
He ran for the House again in 2004, losing to Kathy L. Chinn. On his third attempt in 2006 Tom Shively was finally victorious, defeating Chinn in a rematch from 2004. He was subsequently reelected in 2008 and 2010. New Missouri House district boundaries meant that Shively faced Republican Lindell Shumake whose 6th district seat had also been affected by redistricting. Shively lost the November general election 56 to 44 percent.

Legislative assignments
Representative Shively will serve on the following committees during the 96th General Assembly:
 Agriculture Policy
 Appropriations - Agriculture and Natural Resources subcommittee
 Budget
 Elementary and Secondary Education

References

Democratic Party members of the Missouri House of Representatives
People from Shelbyville, Missouri
University of Missouri alumni
1946 births
Living people